Better Oblivion Community Center is the debut studio album by American indie rock duo Better Oblivion Community Center, composed of Conor Oberst and Phoebe Bridgers. The album was released on January 24, 2019, through Dead Oceans.

Background and recording
Bridgers and Oberst wrote and recorded the album in secret in Los Angeles in mid- to late 2018.

Music and themes
Writing for Rolling Stone, Will Hermes called its music "soft rock for hard times", while Pitchfork'''s Sam Sodomsky called it a "tight-knit folk-rock album".

The album is a loose concept album about the Better Oblivion Community Center, a fictional dystopian wellness facility.

Release and promotion
The album had an elaborate rollout featuring cryptic brochures and a telephone hotline. They performed "Dylan Thomas" on The Late Show with Stephen Colbert on January 23, 2019. The album was released the next day.

On January 29, 2019, the band announced their initial concert tour of the United States and Europe along with releasing a music video for their initial single, "Dylan Thomas", directed by Michelle Zauner of the band Japanese Breakfast.

Critical receptionBetter Oblivion Community Center has received generally positive reviews from critics. At Metacritic, which assigns a normalised rating out of 100 to reviews from mainstream publications, the album received an average score of 78, based on 24 reviews.

Writing for Rolling Stone, Will Hermes said, "The duo harmonize beautifully, Oberst's voice often just a brooding floorboard creak behind Bridgers' brightly bloodshot confidences". David Sackllah of Under the Radar said, "This is a cohesive, creative, and multi-faceted record that will over-joy fans of both artists while offering the spark of magic that so rarely comes with these kinds of collaborations." Sam Walker-Smart of Clash praised the album, stating "its depth, brave sonic choices and chemistry make for a near perfect record. Rather than sticking purely with the sad acoustic vibes, the album effortlessly blends country, electro elements and alt-rock with ease. It's as if the LP was simultaneously recorded in 2018, 2007, and 1993, a tonal greatest hits of hard-hitting emotion and fist-pumping fun." Sarah Murphy of Exclaim!'' gave the album 8/10, stating "The best parts of the album... are the moments where it doesn't sound exactly like anything either artist has released before."

Accolades

Track listing

Personnel
Phoebe Bridgers – vocals (1–10), guitar (1–4, 6–8), electric piano (2), baritone guitar (9, 10); production, photography
Conor Oberst – vocals (1–10), guitar (1, 2, 4, 7–9), baritone guitar (3), piano (4, 10), keyboards (5), Whirly tube (7); production, photography
Christian Lee Hutson – EBow (1), tambourine (3), guitar (6, 8), pocket piano (6)
Carla Azar – drums (1, 3, 5, 10), percussion (1,10)
Andy LeMaster – bass guitar (1), synthesizer (1, 5, 6), programming (5), pocket piano (5), Mellotron (5), samples (10); production, engineering
Griffin Goldsmith – drums (2, 4, 7, 8, 9), percussion (2, 4, 7, 8, 9)
Wylie Gelber – bass guitar (2, 4, 7, 8, 9)
Nick White – keyboard (2)
Nick Zinner – guitar (3, 10)
Anna Butterss – bass guitar (3, 5), upright bass (10)
John Congleton – synthesizer (3); mixing
Nathaniel Walcott – synthesizer (6)
Marshall Vore – percussion (9)
Taylor Hollingsworth – sampled voice (10)
Bob Ludwig – mastering
Nik Freitas – photography
Nathaniel David Utesch – design, layout

Charts

References

2019 debut albums
Albums produced by Phoebe Bridgers
Dead Oceans albums
Albums produced by Andy LeMaster
Collaborative albums
Better Oblivion Community Center albums